Chen Zhe (born 28 February 1993) is a Chinese
former professional snooker player from Shanxi who won five matches at Q School in 2012 to earn a two-year card to play on the World Snooker Tour starting in the 2012–13 season. He is based in Romford, England during the season and practises with Ronnie O'Sullivan.

Career

Debut season
Chen won his first professional match on the Main Tour beating Pankaj Advani 5–4 in the 2012 Wuxi Classic first qualifying round. He was whitewashed 0–5 by Simon Bedford in the next round. He won three matches to reach the final qualifying round of both the World Open and China Open, losing to Michael Holt (3–5) and Jamie Cope (4–5) respectively. Chen won through to the semi-finals of the minor ranking Asian Players Tour Championship Event 1 by defeating the likes of Tom Ford and Ben Woollaston, but lost 2–4 to Stephen Lee. His season ended when he was beaten 7–10 by Sam Baird in the first round of World Championship Qualifying, which saw him finish his first season on tour ranked world number 78.

2013/2014 season
In his opening match of the 2013–14 season, Chen defeated Matthew Selt 5–3 to qualify for the 2013 Wuxi Classic in China where he lost 5–2 to Ben Woollaston in the first round. Chen also qualified for the Indian Open with a 4–2 win over Robert Milkins, but was beaten 4–3 by Hammad Miah. Chen did not win another match in ranking events until in qualifying for the final event of the year, the World Championship, where he beat Anthony Parsons 10–8, before losing by a reverse of this scoreline in the second round against Mark Joyce. At the end of his second season Chen was ranked world number 89 and was relegated from the main tour as he was not in the top 64. He entered Q School to try and earn his place back with Chen being two wins from succeeding in the first event, but he lost 4–1 to Chris Melling.

2014/2015 season
Chen's 2014–15 season was restricted to appearances at the three Asian Tour events. He was beaten 4–1 by Ju Reti in the first round of the Yixing Open and saw off Liang Wenbo 4–3 at the Haining City Open, before losing 4–3 to Ross Muir in the second round. At the Xuzhou Open he beat Feng Zeyuan, but surrendered  a 3–0 lead in the second round against Mark Williams to be defeated 4–3. Chen entered Q School for the second year in a row and came close to progressing through the first event as he won four matches to reach the final round, where he lost 4–1 to Sydney Wilson. In the second event he was knocked out in the first round 4–0 by Andy Hicks.

2015/2016 season
Chen successfully progressed through Q School by winning five matches, concluding with a 4–1 victory over David Lilley to secure a new two-year tour place.

2016/2017 season

Chen won a match at the venue stage of a ranking event for the first time by defeating Ross Muir 4–1 in the first round of the Northern Ireland Open. He narrowly lost 4–3 to Michael White in the following round after having been 2–0 up. His only other match win after this came at the Shoot-Out.

Performance and rankings timeline

References

External links

Chen Zhe at worldsnooker.com

Living people
Chinese snooker players
Sportspeople from Taiyuan
1993 births